A novelization (or novelisation) is a derivative novel that adapts the story of a work created for another medium, such as a film, TV series, stage play, comic book or video game. Film novelizations were particularly popular before the advent of home video, but continue to find commercial success as part of marketing campaigns for major films. They are often written by accomplished writers based on an early draft of the film's script and on a tight deadline.

History and purpose

Novelizations of films began to be produced in the 1910s and 1920s for silent films such as Les Vampires (1915–16) and London After Midnight (1927). One of the first films with spoken dialogue to be novelized was King Kong (1933). Film novelizations were especially profitable during the 1970s before home video became available, as they were then the only way to re-experience popular movies other than television airing or a rerelease in theaters. The novelizations of Star Wars (1977), Alien (1979) and Star Trek:The Motion Picture (1979) sold millions of copies.

The first ever video game to be novelised was Shadowkeep, in 1984.

Even after the advent of home video, film novelizations remain popular, with the adaptation of Godzilla (2014) being included on The New York Times Best Seller list for mass-market paperbacks. This has been attributed to these novels' appeal to fans: About 50% of novelizations are sold to people who have watched the film and want to explore its characters further, or to reconnect to the enthusiasm they experienced when watching the film. A film is therefore also a sort of commercial for its novelization; the film's success or failure affects the novelization's sales. Conversely, film novelizations help generate publicity for upcoming films, serving as a link in the film's marketing chain.

According to publishing industry estimates, about one or two percent of the audience of a film will buy its novelization. This makes these relatively inexpensively produced works a commercially attractive proposition in the case of blockbuster film franchises. The increasing number of previously established novelists taking on tie-in works has been credited with these works gaining a "patina of respectability" after they had previously been disregarded in literary circles as derivative and mere merchandise.

Variants

Film 

The writer of a novelization is supposed to multiply the 20,000–25,000 words of a screenplay into at least 60,000 words. Writers usually achieve that by adding description or introspection. Ambitious writers are driven to work on transitions and characters just to accomplish "a more prose-worthy format". Sometimes the "novelizer" invents new scenes in order to give the plot "added dimension", provided they are allowed to do that. Publishers aim to have novelizations in shops before a film is released, which means it is usually necessary to base the novelization on a screenplay instead of the completed film. It might take an insider to tell whether a novelization diverges unintentionally from the final film because it is based on an earlier version which included deleted scenes. Thus the novelization occasionally presents material which will later on appear in a director's cut. In some cases, separate novelizations of the same film are written for publication in different countries, and these may be based on different drafts of the screenplay, as was very clearly the case with the American and British novelizations of Capricorn One. Writers select different approaches to enrich a screenplay. Dewey Gram's Gladiator, for example, included historical background information.

If a film is based on a novel, the original novel is generally reissued with a cover based on the film's poster. If a film company also wishes to have a separate novelization published, the company is supposed to approach the author who has "Separated Rights". A writer has these rights if he contributed the source material (or added a great deal of creative input to it) and if he was moreover properly credited.

Novelizations also exist where the film itself is based on an original novel: novelist and screenwriter Christopher Wood wrote a novelization of the James Bond film The Spy Who Loved Me. Although the 1962 Ian Fleming novel was still available in bookstores, its story had nothing to do with the 1977 film. To avoid confusion, Wood's novelization was titled James Bond, The Spy Who Loved Me. This novel is also an example of a screenwriter novelizing his own screenplay. Star Wars: From the Adventures of Luke Skywalker was published under the name of George Lucas but his script had been novelized by the prolific tie-in writer Alan Dean Foster.

Acquiring editors looking for a novelizer have different issues. The author may not have all of the information needed; Foster wrote the Alien novelization without knowing what the Xenomorph looked like. The contract may be very restrictive; Max Allan Collins had to write the novelization for Road to Perdition only based on the film, without the detail he had created for the graphic novel of the same name that the film is based on. Rewrites of scripts may force last-minute novelization rewrites. The script for the 1966 film Modesty Blaise was rewritten by five different authors. The writer or script doctor responsible for the so-called "final" version is not necessarily the artist who has contributed the original idea or most of the scenes. The patchwork character of a film script might even exacerbate because the film director, a principal actor or a consulting script doctor does rewrites during the shooting. An acquiring editor who intends to hire one of the credited screenwriters has to reckon that the early writers are no longer familiar with the current draft or work already on another film script. Not every screenwriter is available, willing to work for less money than what can be earned with film scripts and able to deliver the required amount of prose on time. Even if so, there is still the matter of novelizations having a questionable reputation. The International Association of Media Tie-In Writers concedes that by saying their craft is "largely unrecognized". Writers Guild of America rules require that screenwriters have right of first refusal to write novelizations of their own films, but they rarely do so because of the lack of prestige and money.

Some novels blur the line between a novelization and an original novel that is the basis of a film adaptation. Arthur C. Clarke provided the ideas for Stanley Kubrick's 2001: A Space Odyssey. Based on his own short stories and his cooperation with Kubrick during the preparation and making of this film adaptation he wrote the film novelization of the same name which is appreciated by fans because the film provides little exposition, and the novelization fills in some blanks. David Morrell wrote the novel First Blood about John Rambo, which led to the film adaptation of the same name. Although Rambo dies at the end of his original story, Morrell had a paragraph in his contract stipulating he remained "the only person who could write books about Rambo". This paid off for him when the film producers changed the ending and decided for a sequel. David Morrell accepted to carry out the novelization and negotiated unprecedented liberties which resulted in a likewise unprecedented success when his book entered The New York Times Best Seller list and stayed there for six weeks.

Simon Templar or James Bond are examples of media franchises that have been popular for more than one generation. When the feature film The Saint was released in 1997 the creator of this character (Leslie Charteris) had already been dead for four years. Hence its novelization had to be written by another author. Ian Fleming on the other hand had official successors who wrote contemporary "Post-Fleming" James Bond novels. During his tenure John Gardner was consequently chosen to write the novelization of Licence to Kill in 1989 and also the novelization of GoldenEye in 1995. John Gardner found his successor in Raymond Benson who wrote besides several original Bond novels three novelizations including The World Is Not Enough.

Comics
While comic books such as the series Classics Illustrated have often provided adaptations of novels, novelizations of comics are relatively rare.

Video games
Video games are novelized in the same manner as films. While gamers might enjoy playing a certain action scene for hours, the buyers of a novelization might be bored soon if they merely read about such a scene. Consequently, the writer will have to cut down on the action.

Authors
Novelization writers are often also accomplished original fiction writers, as well as fans of the works they adapt, which helps motivate them to undertake a commission that is generally compensated with a relatively low flat fee. Alan Dean Foster, for example, said that, as a fan, "I got to make my own director's cut. I got to fix the science mistakes, I got to enlarge on the characters, if there was a scene I particularly liked, I got to do more of it, and I had an unlimited budget. So it was fun".

Writing skill is particularly needed for challenging situations common to writing novelizations of popular media, such as lack of access to information about the film, last-minute script changes and very quick turnaround times. Collins had to write the novelization of In the Line of Fire in nine days.

Although novelizations tend to have a low prestige, and are often viewed as "hackwork", several critically acclaimed literary authors have written novelizations, including, Arthur Calder-Marshall, William Kotzwinkle and Richard Elman. Best-selling author Ken Follett, early in his career, also wrote a novelization, and so did Isaac Asimov, later in his career. While increasingly also a domain of previously established novelists, tie-in writing still has the disadvantages, from the writers' point of view, of modest pay, tight deadlines and no ownership in the intellectual property created.

The International Association of Media Tie-In Writers is an American association that aims to recognize the writers of adapted and tie-in fiction. It hands out annual awards, the "Scribes", in categories including "best adapted novel".

TV series
Doctor Who had stories novelised in particular from the era of its original series published by Target Books.

Episodes of Star Trek were adapted into short stories by the noted science fiction writer James Blish. Each volume of the stories included a number of the short story adaptations. Alan Dean Foster would later adapt the follow-up animated series into the Star Trek Log series.

Mel Gilden wrote novelizations of Beverly Hills, 90210, merging three episodes into one book. As he explained, this approach required him to look for a joint story arc.

Comics 
In the early 1970s Lee Falk was asked by the Avon publishing house to deliver Phantom novels based on the eponymous comic strip. Falk worked on the novelizations on his own and with collaboration. A dispute over how he would be credited led to the cessation of the series.

Peter O'Donnell, who scripted the Modesty Blaise comic strip, later authored novels featuring the character not directly based on the stories presented in the strips.

Video games
Matt Forbeck became a writer of novels based on video games after he had been "writing tabletop roleplaying game books for over a decade". He worked also as a designer of video games.

S. D. Perry wrote a series of novels based on the Resident Evil video games and added tie-ins to the novelizations, covering all the mainline titles in the series up until Resident Evil Zero.

Eric Nylund introduced a new concept for a novelization when he delivered a trilogy, consisting of a prequel titled Halo: The Fall of Reach, an actual novelization titled Halo: First Strike and a sequel titled Halo: Ghosts of Onyx.

Raymond Benson novelized the original Metal Gear Solid in 2008 and its sequel Metal Gear Solid 2: Sons of Liberty, while Project Itoh wrote a Japanese language novelization of Metal Gear Solid 4: Guns of the Patriots also in 2008 (with an English adaptation later published in 2012). Itoh was set to write novelizations of Metal Gear Solid 3: Snake Eater and Metal Gear Solid: Peace Walker, but his death in 2009 resulted in these projects being handed to Beatless author Satoshi Hase and a new writer named Hitori Nojima (a pen name for Kenji Yano) respectively. Nojima would go on to write Metal Gear Solid: Substance (a two-part alternate novelization of the original Metal Gear Solid and Metal Gear Solid 2), as well as the novelizations of Metal Gear Solid V: The Phantom Pain and Death Stranding (a game which he helped write the script for).

Orphaned novelizations

In some cases an otherwise standard novel may be based on an unfilmed screenplay. Ian Fleming's 1961 James Bond novel Thunderball was based on a script he had co-written; in this case his collaborators subsequently sued for plagiarism.

Peter O'Donnell's novel Modesty Blaise was a novelization of a refused film script. In this case the creator of the main character had written the script alone. But later on other authors had changed O'Donnell's original script over and over, until merely one single sentence remained from the original. The novel was released a year before the film and unlike the film it had sequels.

Frederick Forsyth's 1979 novel The Devil's Alternative was based on an unfilmed script he had written.

Cormac McCarthy's 2005 novel No Country for Old Men was adapted from a screenplay the author wrote. This allowed the Coen brothers to stick "almost word for word" faithfully to the book when adapting it back into a screenplay for the acclaimed 2007 film of the same name.

Occasionally a novelization is issued even though the film is never made. Gordon Williams wrote the script and novelization for producer Harry Saltzman's abandoned film The Micronauts.

Lists of novelizations

Novels based on comics
 List of novels based on comics

Novels based on films

Novels by franchise

Standalone novels

Novels based on plays
Peter and Wendy (1911), J. M. Barrie
The Bat (1926), Stephen Vincent Benét

Novels based on television programs

Standalone novels

Novels by series

Novels based on video games
 List of novels based on video games

See also

Tie-in
Ballantine Books
Dell Publishing
Target Books
Tor Books
Alan Dean Foster
List of Alien (franchise) novels
List of Alien vs. Predator novels
List of Disney novelizations
List of Doctor Who novelizations
List of Nickelodeon novelizations
List of Predator (franchise) novels
List of Star Trek novels
List of Star Wars books
List of television series made into books
The X-Files literature

References

Works cited

Further reading

External links
"Read 'Em and Weep", Article by Joe Queenan for The Guardian
"Revenge of the Novelizations", Articles by Mutant Reviewers From Hell:
Part I, Part II, Part III, Part IV

Books by type